Golden Eagle Tiandi Tower B is a supertall skyscraper located in Nanjing, Jiangsu, China. Construction began in 2013 and ended in 2019.

See also
Golden Eagle Tiandi Tower A
List of tallest buildings in China

References

Skyscraper office buildings in Nanjing
Buildings and structures under construction in China